Correlation is a measure of relationship between two mathematical variables or measured data values, which includes the Pearson correlation coefficient as a special case.

Correlation may also refer to:
 Electronic correlation, a description of the interaction between electrons in a quantum system
 Phase correlation, an analysis of translative movement between images
 Correlation (projective geometry), a type of duality amongst subspaces of a vector space
 Correlation (geology) is the scientific study of lithological or chronological equivalence between geological phenomena in different regions. 
 Cross-correlation, a measure of similarity between two signals, used e.g. in seismology, to analyse seismic waves to determine the location of earthquakes 
 Priesthood Correlation Program, a systematic approach for maintaining consistency in The Church of Jesus Christ of Latter-day Saints (LDS Church)
 Correlations (album), a 1979 album by Ashra

See also
 Correlation function (disambiguation)